Professor dr. hab. Krystyna Skarżyńska is Polish psychologist, professor of humanities, holding the positions of full professor at the SWPS University of Social Sciences and Humanities and the Institute of Psychology of the Polish Academy of Sciences, expert in political psychology  and social psychology.

She graduated from the Faculty of Journalism and Political Sciences, University of Warsaw. In 1993 she received the scientific title of professor in humanities.

Books
 Człowiek a polityka. Zarys psychologii politycznej (2005)
 Konformizm i samokierowanie jako wartości (struktura i źródła) (1991)
 Psychospołeczne aspekty decyzji alokacyjnych (1985)
 Spostrzeganie ludzi (1981)
 Studia nad spostrzeganiem osób. Regulacyjna funkcja informacji centralnych (1979)

References

Year of birth missing (living people)
Living people
Polish psychologists
Polish women psychologists
Academic staff of SWPS University
Academic staff of the Polish Academy of Sciences
University of Warsaw alumni